Hildegardo Francisco Guerra Martínez (8 October 1936 – 28 February 2018), known artistically as Rogelio Guerra, was a Mexican actor. While primarily active in movies and television, he also was known for his work in theater and dubbing.

Filmography

Selected films

Television roles

Awards and nominations

References

External links

1936 births
2018 deaths
Mexican male telenovela actors
21st-century Mexican male actors
Mexican male television actors
20th-century Mexican male actors
Male actors from Aguascalientes
People from Aguascalientes City